In the field of hyperbolic geometry, the order-4 hexagonal tiling honeycomb arises as one of 11 regular paracompact honeycombs in 3-dimensional hyperbolic space. It is paracompact because it has cells composed of an infinite number of faces.  Each cell is a hexagonal tiling whose vertices lie on a horosphere: a flat plane in hyperbolic space that approaches a single ideal point at infinity.

The Schläfli symbol of the order-4 hexagonal tiling honeycomb is {6,3,4}. Since that of the hexagonal tiling is {6,3}, this honeycomb has four such hexagonal tilings meeting at each edge.  Since the Schläfli symbol of the octahedron is {3,4}, the vertex figure of this honeycomb is an octahedron.  Thus, eight hexagonal tilings meet at each vertex of this honeycomb, and the six edges meeting at each vertex lie along three orthogonal axes.

Images

Symmetry 

The order-4 hexagonal tiling honeycomb has three reflective simplex symmetry constructions. 

The half-symmetry uniform construction {6,31,1} has two types (colors) of hexagonal tilings, with Coxeter diagram  ↔ . A quarter-symmetry construction also exists, with four colors of hexagonal tilings: .

An additional two reflective symmetries exist with non-simplectic fundamental domains: [6,3*,4], which is index 6, with Coxeter diagram ; and [6,(3,4)*], which is index 48. The latter has a cubic fundamental domain, and an octahedral Coxeter diagram with three axial infinite branches: . It can be seen as using eight colors to color the hexagonal tilings of the honeycomb.

The order-4 hexagonal tiling honeycomb contains , which tile 2-hypercycle surfaces and are similar to the truncated infinite-order triangular tiling, :

Related polytopes and honeycombs 

The order-4 hexagonal tiling honeycomb is a regular hyperbolic honeycomb in 3-space, and one of 11 which are paracompact.

There are fifteen uniform honeycombs in the [6,3,4] Coxeter group family, including this regular form, and its dual, the order-6 cubic honeycomb.

The order-4 hexagonal tiling honeycomb has a related alternated honeycomb,  ↔ , with triangular tiling and octahedron cells.

It is a part of sequence of regular honeycombs of the form {6,3,p}, all of which are composed of hexagonal tiling cells:

This honeycomb is also related to the 16-cell, cubic honeycomb and order-4 dodecahedral honeycomb, all of which have octahedral vertex figures.

The aforementioned honeycombs are also quasiregular:

Rectified order-4 hexagonal tiling honeycomb 

The rectified order-4 hexagonal tiling honeycomb, t1{6,3,4},  has octahedral and trihexagonal tiling facets, with a square prism vertex figure.

It is similar to the 2D hyperbolic tetraapeirogonal tiling, r{∞,4},  which alternates apeirogonal and square faces:

Truncated order-4 hexagonal tiling honeycomb 

The truncated order-4 hexagonal tiling honeycomb, t0,1{6,3,4},  has octahedron and truncated hexagonal tiling facets, with a square pyramid vertex figure.

It is similar to the 2D hyperbolic truncated order-4 apeirogonal tiling, t{∞,4},  with apeirogonal and square faces:

Bitruncated order-4 hexagonal tiling honeycomb 

The bitruncated order-4 hexagonal tiling honeycomb, t1,2{6,3,4},  has truncated octahedron and hexagonal tiling cells, with a digonal disphenoid vertex figure.

Cantellated order-4 hexagonal tiling honeycomb 

The cantellated order-4 hexagonal tiling honeycomb, t0,2{6,3,4},  has cuboctahedron, cube, and rhombitrihexagonal tiling cells, with a wedge vertex figure.

Cantitruncated order-4 hexagonal tiling honeycomb 

The cantitruncated order-4 hexagonal tiling honeycomb, t0,1,2{6,3,4},  has truncated octahedron, cube, and truncated trihexagonal tiling cells, with a mirrored sphenoid vertex figure.

Runcinated order-4 hexagonal tiling honeycomb 

The runcinated order-4 hexagonal tiling honeycomb, t0,3{6,3,4},  has cube, hexagonal tiling and hexagonal prism cells, with an irregular triangular antiprism vertex figure.

It contains the 2D hyperbolic rhombitetrahexagonal tiling, rr{4,6},  with square and hexagonal faces. The tiling also has a half symmetry construction .

Runcitruncated order-4 hexagonal tiling honeycomb 

The runcitruncated order-4 hexagonal tiling honeycomb, t0,1,3{6,3,4},  has rhombicuboctahedron, cube, dodecagonal prism, and truncated hexagonal tiling cells, with an isosceles-trapezoidal pyramid vertex figure.

Runcicantellated order-4 hexagonal tiling honeycomb 

The runcicantellated order-4 hexagonal tiling honeycomb is the same as the runcitruncated order-6 cubic honeycomb.

Omnitruncated order-4 hexagonal tiling honeycomb 

The omnitruncated order-4 hexagonal tiling honeycomb, t0,1,2,3{6,3,4},  has truncated cuboctahedron, truncated trihexagonal tiling, dodecagonal prism, and octagonal prism cells, with an irregular tetrahedron vertex figure.

Alternated order-4 hexagonal tiling honeycomb 

The alternated order-4 hexagonal tiling honeycomb,  ↔ , is composed of triangular tiling and octahedron cells, in a truncated octahedron vertex figure.

Cantic order-4 hexagonal tiling honeycomb 

The cantic order-4 hexagonal tiling honeycomb,  ↔ , is composed of trihexagonal tiling, truncated octahedron, and cuboctahedron cells, with a wedge vertex figure.

Runcic order-4 hexagonal tiling honeycomb 

The runcic order-4 hexagonal tiling honeycomb,  ↔ , is composed of triangular tiling, rhombicuboctahedron, cube, and triangular prism cells, with a triangular cupola vertex figure.

Runcicantic order-4 hexagonal tiling honeycomb 

The runcicantic order-4 hexagonal tiling honeycomb,  ↔ , is composed of trihexagonal tiling, truncated cuboctahedron, truncated cube, and triangular prism cells, with a rectangular pyramid vertex figure.

Quarter order-4 hexagonal tiling honeycomb 

See also 
 Convex uniform honeycombs in hyperbolic space
 Regular tessellations of hyperbolic 3-space
 Paracompact uniform honeycombs

References 

Coxeter, Regular Polytopes, 3rd. ed., Dover Publications, 1973. . (Tables I and II: Regular polytopes and honeycombs, pp. 294–296)
 The Beauty of Geometry: Twelve Essays (1999), Dover Publications,  (Chapter 10, Regular Honeycombs in Hyperbolic Space) Table III
 Jeffrey R. Weeks The Shape of Space, 2nd edition  (Chapter 16-17: Geometries on Three-manifolds I,II)
 Norman Johnson Uniform Polytopes, Manuscript
 N.W. Johnson: The Theory of Uniform Polytopes and Honeycombs, Ph.D. Dissertation, University of Toronto, 1966 
 N.W. Johnson: Geometries and Transformations, (2018) Chapter 13: Hyperbolic Coxeter groups

Hexagonal tilings
Honeycombs (geometry)